Catathyridium is a genus of mainly freshwater American soles native to South America.

Species
The currently recognized species in this genus are:
 Catathyridium garmani (Jordan, 1889)
 Catathyridium grandirivi (Chabanaud, 1928)
 Catathyridium jenynsii (Günther, 1862)
 Catathyridium lorentzii (Weyenbergh (de), 1877)

References

Achiridae
Ray-finned fish genera
Taxa named by Paul Chabanaud